Hye-mi is a Korean feminine given name. Its meaning depends on the hanja used to write each syllable of the name. There are 16 hanja with the reading "hye" and 33 hanja with the reading "mi" on the South Korean government's official list of hanja which may be used in given names.

People with this name include:
Kang Hye-mi (born 1974), South Korean volleyball player
Woo Hye-mi (born 1988), South Korean singer
Na Hye-mi (born 1991), South Korean actress and model
Ra Hye-mi, South Korean rower, silver medalist in rowing at the 2010 Asian Games
Kim Hye-mi (born 1983), South Korean taekwondo practitioner

Fictional characters with this name include:
Go Hye-mi, in 2011 South Korean television series Dream High

See also
List of Korean given names

References

Korean feminine given names